Kalavantin is a Marathi film released on 28 October 1978. Produced by Chelaram Bhatia along with Lalchand Bhatia and directed by Anant Mane.

Cast 

The cast includes Kuldeep Pawar, Ranjana, Usha Naik, Avinash Masurkar & Others.

Producers
The Bhatia Duo: Chelaram Bhatia and Lalchand Bhatia.(Glamour Films)

Soundtrack
The music is provided by Ram Kadam.

"Kapaad Purnea Cholia" - Usha Mangeshkar
"Pikalya Panacha Deth" - Usha Mangeshkar
"Jhananana Jhananana Jhankar" - Usha Mangeshkar
"Raat Jhurtiya Chandrasathi" - Shobha Gurtu
"Mee Ek Roop Vhave" - Suresh Wadkar

References

External links 
 Latest Marathi Movie News
 Movie Album - gaana.com

1978 films
1970s Marathi-language films
Films scored by Ram Kadam